Elbigenalp is a municipality in the district of Reutte in the Austrian state of Tyrol.

Geography
Elbigenalp lies about in the middle of the Lech valley.

References

External links

Cities and towns in Reutte District